Mary Soon Lee (born 1965) is a British speculative fiction writer and poet.

Biography

Early life 
Mary Soon Lee was born in London, England, to a Malaysian Chinese father and an Irish mother. As a child, she enjoyed reading science fiction and fantasy, especially the works of Ursula K. Le Guin and Robert A. Heinlein. She cites J.R.R. Tolkien's Lord of the Rings and the fantasy poetry of Alfred, Lord Tennyson, among others, as works that influenced her relationship to literature from an early age.

As a child, Soon Lee wanted to be a scientist, but her focus narrowed to mathematics in her teenage years.

Education and career 
Soon Lee earned a Master of Arts in mathematics and a diploma in computer science from Trinity Hall, Cambridge. She also holds a Master of Science in Astronautics and Space Engineering from Cranfield University.

In 1990, Soon Lee moved to the United States. She began writing television scripts and short stories shortly thereafter, making her first professional sale in 1993. Since that time, her poems and short stories, mostly pertaining to the genres of science fiction or fantasy, have appeared in numerous journals and anthologies, and she has published collections of her work.

Marriage and children 
Soon Lee currently resides in Pittsburgh, Pennsylvania with her husband and daughter, both of whom occasionally act as first readers for her work. She also has a son.

Recognition
Poems by Mary Soon Lee placed first in the Rhysling Awards for speculative poetry in the Long category in 2014 and in the Short category in 2018. Poems of hers placed third in the Long category of the Rhyslings in 2017 and 2018, and her work was nominated for both categories of the award on several other occasions.

Soon Lee's poetry collections Crowned: The Sign Of The Dragon Book 1 and Elemental Haiku placed first in 2016 and second in 2020, respectively, in the annual Elgin Awards for best SFF poetry book.

Her fiction has been widely anthologized, including appearances in volumes 4 and 5 of Year's Best SF and honorable mentions in volumes 16 and 18 of The Year's Best Science Fiction.

Bibliography

Short fiction 
Collections
 Winter Shadows and Other Tales (2001)
 Ebb Tides and Other Tales (2002)

Poetry 
Collections
 Crowned (2015)
 Elemental Haiku (2019)
 The Sign of the Dragon (2020)
List of poems

References

External links

 Bibliography

1965 births
Living people
20th-century American women writers
20th-century British short story writers
21st-century American women writers
21st-century British short story writers
Alumni of the University of Cambridge
American short story writers
American women short story writers
British fantasy writers
British science fiction writers
British women short story writers
The Magazine of Fantasy & Science Fiction people
Women science fiction and fantasy writers
Writers from London
Writers from Pennsylvania